Ed Levy (1916–2008) was a baseball player.

Ed Levy or Ed Levi may also refer to:

Edward H. Levi (1911–2000), former United States Attorney General
Edward Lawrence Levy (1851–1932), British world weightlifting champion
Edward Lawrence Levy (fraudster) (died 1892), Victorian solicitor convicted of forgery, fraud and perjury
Ed Levy (tennis), tennis player (see SAP Open)
Ted Levy, rugby player
Edward Levy, horror writer
Edward Levy-Lawson, 1st Baron Burnham (1833–1916), British newspaper proprietor